The 2017 Texas State Bobcats baseball team represented the Texas State University in the 2017 NCAA Division I baseball season. The Bobcats played their home games at Bobcat Ballpark.

Schedule and results
Texas State announced its 2017 baseball schedule on October 26, 2016. The 2017 schedule consisted of 33 home and 23 away games in the regular season. The Bobcats hosted Sun Belts foes Arkansas State, Coastal Carolina, Georgia State, Louisiana–Monroe, and Texas–Arlington and will travel to Appalachian State, Little Rock, Louisiana, South Alabama, and Troy.

The 2017 Sun Belt Conference Championship was contested May 24–28 in Statesboro, Georgia, and was hosted by Georgia Southern.

Texas State finished 4th in the west division of the conference which qualified the Bobcats to compete in the tournament as the 8th seed  to seek for the team's 1st Sun Belt Conference tournament title.

 Rankings are based on the team's current  ranking in the Collegiate Baseball poll.

References

Texas State
Texas State Bobcats baseball seasons